Sir Walter Langdon-Brown (13 August 1870 – 3 October 1946) was a British medical doctor and writer.

Biography

He was born in Bedford, the son of the Rev. John Brown of Bunyan's Chapel, Bedford and his wife, Ada Haydon Ford (1837–1929). His mother was a niece of John Langdon Down, describer of Down syndrome.  His sister was Florence Ada Keynes, the social reformer, wife of John Neville Keynes and mother of John Maynard Keynes (see Keynes family).

He was educated at Bedford School and St. John's College, Cambridge.  He served as an army doctor in the Second Boer War and World War I. He worked at St Bartholomew's Hospital with Samuel Gee, and later at the Metropolitan Free Hospital, London.

He was the author of a number of medical textbooks, a lecturer at the Royal College of Physicians, and went on to become Regius Professor of Physic at the University of Cambridge. He was knighted on his retirement in 1935.

The Langdon-Brown lectureship at the Royal College of Physicians was founded in his memory in 1950 by a gift from his second wife, Lady Freda Langdon-Brown.

Selected publications

The Practitioner's Encyclopaedia of Medical Treatment (with J. Keogh Murphy, 1915)
Physiological Principles in Treatment (1915)
The Sympathetic Nervous System in Disease (1920)

References

External links
 

1870 births
1946 deaths
20th-century English medical doctors
Regius Professors of Physic (Cambridge)
Alumni of St John's College, Cambridge
Knights Bachelor
People educated at Bedford School
Presidents of the History of Medicine Society